The first  season of Dancing Brasil premiered on Monday, April 3, 2017 at 10:30 p.m. (BRT / AMT) on RecordTV.

Cast

Couples

Scoring chart

Key
 
 
  Eliminated
  Risk zone
  Withdrew
  Third place
  Runner-up
  Winner

Weekly scores
Individual judges' scores in the charts below (given in parentheses) are listed in this order from left to right: Jaime Arôxa, Fernanda Chamma, Paulo Goulart Filho

Week 1: First Dances 
Running order

Week 2: No Theme 
Running order

Week 3: Movie Night 
Running order

Week 4: No Theme 
Running order

Week 5: Most Memorable Year 
Running order

Week 6: 70s Night 
Running order

Week 7: Xuxa Night 
Running order

Week 8: Switch-Up 
Running order

Week 9: Switch-Back 
Running order

Week 10: June Festival 
Running order

Week 11: Lover's Night 
Running order

Week 12: Semifinals 
Running order

Week 13: Finals
Running order

Dance chart 
 Week 1: One unlearned dance (First Dances)
 Week 2: One unlearned dance (No Theme)
 Week 3: One unlearned dance (Movie Night)
 Week 4: One unlearned dance (No Theme)
 Week 5: One unlearned dance (Most Memorable Year)
 Week 6: One unlearned dance (70s Night)
 Week 7: One unlearned dance (Xuxa Night)
 Week 8: One unlearned dance (Switch-Up)
 Week 9: One unlearned dance (Switch-Back)
 Week 10: One unlearned dance (June Festival)
 Week 11: One unlearned dance and team dances (Lovers' Night)
 Week 12: Two unlearned dances (Semifinals)
 Week 13: Redemption dance, Charleston and Favourite style (Finals)

 Highest scoring dance
 Lowest scoring dance

Ratings and reception

Brazilian ratings
All numbers are in points and provided by Kantar Ibope Media.

References

External links 

 Dancing Brasil on R7.com

2017 Brazilian television seasons